Peggy Schwarz (born 4 September 1971 in Berlin) is a German retired pair skater.  She first gained prominence skating with Alexander König.  The duo captured a bronze medal at the 1988 European Figure Skating Championships and then won gold at the German Figure Skating Championships in 1992.  They also competed in the Winter Olympics three times, finishing 7th in 1988, 1992, and again in 1994.

Schwarz took a break from skating and gave birth to a son, Michel, in 1995.  The following year, she joined forces with Mirko Müller.  The pair went on to win three gold medals at the German nationals from 1998 to 2000.  After competing in the 1998 Winter Olympics, they captured the bronze medal at the World Figure Skating Championships that year.  Schwarz retired from skating in 2000.

Programs

With Müller

Results
GP: Champions Series / Grand Prix

With Müller

With König

References

External links
 Official website of Peggy Schwarz and Mirko Müller

1971 births
German female pair skaters
Living people
Figure skaters at the 1988 Winter Olympics
Figure skaters at the 1992 Winter Olympics
Figure skaters at the 1994 Winter Olympics
Figure skaters at the 1998 Winter Olympics
Olympic figure skaters of Germany
People from East Berlin
Figure skaters from Berlin
World Figure Skating Championships medalists
European Figure Skating Championships medalists
Olympic figure skaters of East Germany
East German figure skaters
20th-century German women